Joy is a 2018 Austrian drama film directed and written by Sudabeh Mortezai. The plot revolves around Joy (Anwulika Alphonsus), a young Nigerian woman who walks the streets to pay off debts while also supporting her family in Nigeria and her daughter in Vienna.

It was selected as the Austrian entry for the Best International Feature Film at the 92nd Academy Awards. However, the film was disqualified in November 2019, with the Academy stating that the film had too much dialogue in English. The filmmakers disputed the disqualification, arguing that when the parts of the dialogue in Nigerian Pidgin that are unintelligible to English speakers are counted separately from English, English constitutes less than 50% of the entire dialogue and thus the film should be eligible, but the Academy stood by its initial decision.

Premise 
Joy is a young Nigerian woman walking the streets to pay off debts while supporting her family in Nigeria and her daughter in Vienna. She’s instructed to supervise Precious, a new teenage girl from Nigeria about to go down the same path as her.

Cast 

 Joy Anwulika Alphonsus as Joy
 Mariam Sanusi as Precious
 Angela Ekeleme as Madame

Release
It was released on January 18, 2019 on Netflix streaming.

See also
 List of submissions to the 92nd Academy Awards for Best International Feature Film
 List of Austrian submissions for the Academy Award for Best International Feature Film

References

External links 
 
 

2018 films
Austrian drama films
Hood films
2010s English-language films
English-language Austrian films
2010s German-language films
2018 drama films
2010s American films